The Eglwys Nunydd is a  supply reservoir in Margam, Wales originally constructed in 1963 to provide water for the large steelworks at Margam Specifically the reservoir was to provide a supply of cooling water for the cold rolling mills at the eastern end of the works.

Description

Birdlife
Eglwys Nunydd has shallow, alkaline water with a bed that comprises mainly silt and cobbles where the fertility encourages weed growth which in turn promotes a productive insect population. It was originally designated as a Site of Special Scientific Interest for its birdlife in 1972, and this was confirmed in 1982. The site is notable for its breeding birds which include great crested grebe, little grebe, mallard, gadwall and Eurasian coot. Other species normally present include tufted duck and common pochard and among the local birdwatchers it has a reputation for producing locally rare birds such as goosander, smew, long-tailed duck, greater scaup and great northern diver.

Killer shrimp
In 2010 it was reported that the invasive amphipod Dikerogammarus villosus had been found in the reservoir. However anglers have observed that these crustaceans form a major part of the diet of the reservoir's stocked rainbow trout and have been told to be aware of biosecurity when fishing so they do not transfer the "killer shrimp" to other waters.

Recreation
The lake supports a trout and coarse fishery managed by Tata Game Angling. and is used for dinghy sailing run by the Tata Sailing Club.

References

Margam
Reservoirs in Wales
Buildings and structures in Neath Port Talbot
Bodies of water of Neath Port Talbot
Sites of Special Scientific Interest in West Glamorgan